Ann O’Connor Alabaster (née Warner, 15 February 1842 – 25 February 1915) was a New Zealand teacher and businesswoman. She was the founder of the prestigious boys' secondary school Lincoln Cottage Preparatory School in Christchurch.

Biography 
Alabaster was born in Oxford, Oxfordshire, England, to Sarah Lyne and her husband Robert Warner, a shoemaker. She became a teacher in Oxford and in 1858 married a local vicar, Charles Alabaster (d. 1865). She emigrated with him to New Zealand, arriving in Lyttelton on the Strathallan in January 1859. In 1860 she gave birth to a son, Austin Henry Alabaster. 

In 1862, her husband became ill and was forced to retire, and Alabaster opened a boys' school in Cranmer Square, Christchurch, to prepare boys to enter Christ's College. Alabaster managed the school herself until her retirement in 1882.  

After retiring, she took in lady boarders to earn an income, and then remarried in 1891.

References

1842 births
1915 deaths
English emigrants to New Zealand
19th-century  New Zealand educators
People from Oxford

19th-century New Zealand businesspeople
19th-century New Zealand businesswomen